Mario Rizzetto (born 4 June 1945) is an Italian virologist who in 1977 first reported the Hepatitis D virus as a nuclear antigen in patients infected with HBV who had severe liver disease.

He graduated in Medicine and Surgery at the University of Padua in 1969. He was awarded the King Faisal International Prize in Medicine in 1985, the Robert Koch Prize in 1987, the William Beaumont Prize of the American Gastroenterological Association in 1988, and the Hans Popper Award in 1992.

References

1945 births
Living people
University of Padua alumni
Italian virologists